General Mott may refer to:

Gershom Mott (1822–1884), U.S. Army major general
Harry J. Mott III (born 1929), U.S. Army brigadier general
Stanley Mott (1873–1959), British Army major general